Thord Karlsson (4 December 1941 – 18 May 2017) was a Swedish ski jumper. He competed in the normal hill and large hill events at the 1968 Winter Olympics.

References

External links
 

1941 births
2017 deaths
Swedish male ski jumpers
Olympic ski jumpers of Sweden
Ski jumpers at the 1968 Winter Olympics
People from Kiruna Municipality
Sportspeople from Norrbotten County